This page documents all tornadoes confirmed by various weather forecast offices of the National Weather Service in the United States from October to November 2021. On average, there are 61 confirmed tornadoes in the United States in October, but steady activity throughout the month, plus several smaller outbreaks, pushed the total to a new monthly record of 150 despite the lack of any major tornado outbreaks. By contrast, November saw only 21 tornadoes, well below the average of 58.

United States yearly total

October

October 3 event

October 6 event

October 9 event

October 10 event

October 11 event

October 12 event

October 13 event

October 14 event

October 15 event

October 16 event

October 21 event

October 24 event

October 25 event

October 26 event

October 27 event

October 28 event

November

November 10 event

November 11 event

November 12 event

November 13 event

See also

 Tornadoes of 2021
 List of United States tornadoes from July to September 2021
 List of United States tornadoes in December 2021

Notes

References

2021-related lists
Tornadoes of 2021
Tornadoes
2021, 5
2021 natural disasters in the United States
Tornadoes in the United States